Guatemala competed at the 1996 Summer Olympics in Atlanta, United States. 26 competitors, 25 men and 1 woman, took part in 20 events in 11 sports.

Athletics

Men
Track & road events

Badminton

Canoeing

Slalom
Men

Cycling

Road
Men

Track

Fencing

One woman represented Guatemala in 1996.

Women

Judo

Men

Sailing

Men

Shooting

Men

Swimming

Men

Weightlifting

Wrestling

Freestyle

See also
Guatemala at the 1995 Pan American Games

References

External links
Official Olympic Reports

Nations at the 1996 Summer Olympics
1996
1996 in Guatemalan sport